Doddifoenus is a genus of wasp in the family Pteromalidae.

References

Pteromalidae